Voorhees State Park is a state park in the U.S. state of New Jersey. The park is operated and maintained by the New Jersey Division of Parks and Forestry.

History
Voorhees State Park began when Foster M. Voorhees, a former governor of New Jersey, donated his  farm to the people of New Jersey in 1929.

During the Great Depression in the 1930s, the park served as a camp for the Civilian Conservation Corps (CCC), which planted trees and constructed shelters and trails throughout the park. The park offers views of Round Valley Reservoir and Spruce Run Reservoir. Camping is allowed in the park for a fee, depending on the type of campsite. There are 47 tent and trailer campsites. There are 2 group campsites that can accommodate up to 50 people each. There also are 3 rustic, cabin-like structures with wood stoves for heat.  Each cabin can accommodate up to 4 people in 2 double-deck single bunk beds. All sites and cabins have fire rings and picnic tables. Toilets and showers are within walking distance from the all campsites and cabins.  The trailer sanitary station is open April 1 through October 31. Campsites and cabins are open all year.

In 1965, the New Jersey Astronomical Association built the Paul Robinson Observatory on land leased from the state. The observatory features a  Cassegrain reflecting telescope and offers public sky-watch programs.

Voorhees State Park main entrance is across the street (County Route 513) from Voorhees High School; also named after Foster M. Voorhees.

Gallery

See also

 List of New Jersey state parks
 Voorhees High School

References

External links

 NY-NJTC: Voorhees State Park Trail Details and Info

Parks in Hunterdon County, New Jersey
State parks of New Jersey
IUCN Category V
Civilian Conservation Corps in New Jersey
Civilian Conservation Corps camps
Lebanon Township, New Jersey